Andrew Anderson (born 8 April 1983) is a South African tennis player who regularly played on the ITF Futures Tour and occasionally ATP Challenger Tour.

Anderson reached a career high ATP singles ranking of World No. 376 achieved on 11 October 2010. He also reached a career high ATP doubles ranking of world No. 315 achieved on 27 February 2006.

Anderson made his ATP Tour debut in singles at the 2009 SA Tennis Open where he advanced through the three qualifying rounds to earn his first and only main draw birth. In qualifying, he received a bye in the first round, and then defeated Benjamin Janse Van Rensburg 3–6, 6–3, 7–6(7–1) and then Fritz Wolmarans 6–4, 3–6, 7–6(7–4) to set up a first round match against eighth seed Marcos Baghdatis of Cyprus, which he would go on to lose 4–6, 2–6.

Anderson has reached 7 singles finals in his career, with a record of 6 wins and 1 loss all coming at the ITF Futures level. Additionally, he has reached 25 doubles finals in his career with a record of 13 wins and 12 losses, which includes one victorious appearance at the ATP Challenger level. He won the 2010 Oklahoma Challenger alongside compatriot Fritz Wolmarans, defeating Brett Joelson and Chris Klingemann 6–2. 6–2 in the final to capture the championship.

ATP Challenger and ITF Futures finals

Singles: 7 (6–1)

Doubles: 25 (13–12)

References

External links
 
 
 

1983 births
Living people
Tennis players from Johannesburg
South African male tennis players